Chris Ciamaga (born September 13, 1977, in Buffalo, New York), is a former American Hockey League and National Hockey League referee who wore uniform #13 in the AHL and #41 in the NHL.  Ciamaga began his NHL refereeing career on March 22, 2008, with the New Jersey Devils at Pittsburgh Penguins game.  A member of the NHL Officials' Association from 2006 to 2011, Ciamaga had refereed 17 games at the NHL level.

He was not re-hired in the NHL for the 2011–12 season.  He officiated in the AHL until 2019. His last game was on January 11, 2019, in a matchup between the Toronto Marlies and the Rochester Americans.

References

External links
 NHLOA Biography

1977 births
Living people
American ice hockey officials
Ice hockey people from New York (state)
National Hockey League officials
Sportspeople from Buffalo, New York